Convergent is an adjective for things that converge. It is commonly used in mathematics and may refer to:

Convergent boundary, a type of plate tectonic boundary
 Convergent (continued fraction)
 Convergent evolution
 Convergent series

Convergent may also refer to:
 Convergent Books, an imprint of Crown Publishing Group
 Convergent Technologies, a computer company
 Convergents, a Catalan political party

See also
 Convergence (disambiguation)